The Women's scratch race at the 2018 Commonwealth Games, as part of the cycling programme, took place on 8 April 2018.

Results

References

Women's scratch race
Cycling at the Commonwealth Games – Women's scratch
Comm